Aramoun could refer to the following places in Lebanon.

Aramoun, Aley, a village in Aley District, Mount Lebanon Governorate
Aramoun, Keserwan,  a village in Keserwan District, Mount Lebanon Governorate